Major-General (David) Murray Naylor CB MBE DL (born 5 March 1938) is a former British Army officer who commanded 2nd Infantry Division.

Military career
Educated at Eton College, Naylor enlisted for national service in 1956 and was commissioned into the Scots Guards the following year. As a major he was awarded the MBE in the 1973 New Year Honours. He was appointed Commanding Officer of 2nd Bn Scots Guards in 1976 and led his battalion on active service in Northern Ireland during the Troubles. He was made Assistant Director on the Defence Policy Staff at the Ministry of Defence in 1980, Commander of 22nd Armoured Brigade in Germany in 1982 and Deputy Military Secretary at the Ministry of Defence in 1985. He went on to be General Officer Commanding North East District and Commander 2nd Infantry Division based in York in 1987 and Director of the Territitorial Army and Organisation at the Ministry of Defence in 1989 before retiring in 1992.

In retirement he became Chairman of the North Yorkshire Ambulance Service and, more recently, Chairman of the Kohima Education Trust. He was a County Councillor for North Yorkshire representing Rillington from 1997 to 2005 and is a Deputy Lieutenant of North Yorkshire.

He is also author of the book Among Friends: Scots Guards 1956-93.

Family
In 1965 he married Rosemary Gillian Beach; they have three sons.

References

1938 births
Living people
British Army generals
Companions of the Order of the Bath
Members of the Order of the British Empire
Scots Guards officers
People educated at Eton College
Deputy Lieutenants of North Yorkshire
British military personnel of The Troubles (Northern Ireland)